Chloride anion exchanger, also known as down-regulated in adenoma (protein DRA), is a protein that in humans is encoded by the SLC26A3 gene.

Function 

Protein DRA is a membrane protein in intestinal cells. It is an anion exchanger and a member of the sulfate anion transporter (SAT) family. It mediates chloride and bicarbonate exchange and additionally transports sulfate and other anions at the apical membrane, part of the plasma membrane of enterocytes.  It is different from the anion exchanger that present in erythrocytes, renal tubule, and several other tissues.

The protein encoded by this gene is a transmembrane glycoprotein that functions as a sulfate transporter. It is localized to the mucosa of the lower intestinal tract, particularly to the apical membrane of columnar epithelium and some goblet cells, and is instrumental in chloride reuptake, aiding in the creation of an osmotic gradient for resorption of fluid from the lumen of the intestine.

Clinical significance 

Mutations in this gene have been associated with congenital chloride diarrhoea, a treatable disease.

The congenital absence of this membrane protein results in an autosomal recessive disorder called congenital chloridorrhea or congenital chloride diarrhea (CLD).

See also 
 Solute carrier family

References

Further reading 

 
 
 
 
 
 
 
 
 
 
 
 
 
 
 

Solute carrier family